The Pro Basketball League Finals MVP is an annual award of the Pro Basketball League (PBL), the highest tier professional basketball league in Belgium, given to the league's most valuable player in the finals. The award was first handed out in the 2017–18 season.

Winners

References

Finals MVP
Basketball most valuable player awards
European basketball awards